Petrus Albertus "Piet" Kasteel (4 November 1901 – 13 December 2003) was a Dutch journalist, diplomat, and colonial administrator. He served as Governor of Curaçao and Dependencies from 15 July 1942 until 4 August 1948, Dutch Ambassador to Chile (1948–1956), to Ireland (1956–1966) and briefly to Israel (1966).

Biography
Kasteel was born on 4 November 1901 in Zwolle, Netherlands. He converted to the Catholic Church. In 1923, he moved to Amsterdam, where he became a journalist for De Tijd, and founded the Catholic association De Klare Waarheid. In 1938, he received his doctorate in political and social sciences from KU Leuven on a biography of prime minister Abraham Kuyper.

On 14 May 1940, after the German invasion of the Netherlands, Kasteel as a known anti-fascist boarded a fishing boat leaving his wife and children behind, and arrived in England two days later. He offered his services to the Dutch government-in-exile under the nom de guerre "Chateau neuf du Pape". He started to work for the Ministry of Justice, and befriended Pieter Sjoerds Gerbrandy. In September 1940, Gerbandy became Prime Minister-in-exile, and appointed Kasteel as his personal secretary.

On 15 July 1942, Kasteel was installed as Governor of Curaçao and Dependencies. In 1947 negotiations started for political autonomy of Curaçao and Dependencies. The island of Aruba no longer wanted remain subordinate to Curaçao, and demonstrations were organised. In January 1948, the delegations of Aruba and Curaçao demanded the resignation of Kasteel. In June 1948, Kasteel announced his resignation, and left on 4 August 1948.

Kasteel was appointed Ambassador of the Netherlands to Chile, and served until 1956, In March 1956, he was appointed Ambassador to Ireland, and served until 1966. He served briefly as Ambassador to Israel, and retired in December 1966. After retiring, Kasteel moved to Via della Conciliazione in Rome, Italy near the Vatican where his son  served in the Apostolic Camera.

On 13 December 2003, Kasteel died in Rome, at the age of 102.

Honours
  Knight of the Order of the Netherlands Lion.
  Commander in the Legion of Honour.
  Order of the Southern Cross.
  Medal of Freedom with Silver Palm.
  Knight in the Order of the Holy Sepulchre.

References

External links

 Piet Kasteel at the Digital Library for Dutch Literature (in Dutch)

1901 births
2003 deaths
Governors of the Netherlands Antilles
People from Zwolle
Dutch diplomats
20th-century Dutch male writers
20th-century Dutch journalists
Ambassadors of the Netherlands to Chile
Ambassadors of the Netherlands to Ireland
Ambassadors of the Netherlands to Israel
Engelandvaarders
KU Leuven alumni
Dutch Roman Catholics
Dutch centenarians
Men centenarians
Knights of the Order of the Netherlands Lion
Commandeurs of the Légion d'honneur
Recipients of the Medal of Freedom
Knights of the Holy Sepulchre